Eileen O'Meara is an American artist known for her experimental animated films Agnes Escapes from the Nursing Home, That Strange Person, Panic Attack! and the HBO/UNICEF Cartoon for Children's Rights The Right to Express Yourself.

Career 
Eileen O’Meara has produced and directed animated spots and shorts for clients including HBO, Warner Home Video, Motown, Heal The Bay, Channel One,  and WEA Latina.

Her independent short films Agnes Escapes from the Nursing Home, That Strange Person, and Panic Attack! have screened at Sundance Film Festival, The London Film Festival, PBS, The Movie Channel, and Showtime.

O'Meara's work is featured in Get Animated! Creating Professional Cartoon Animation on your Home Computer by Tim Maloney, and Making it Big in Shorts: The Ultimate Filmmakers Guide to Short Films by Kim Adelman.

Grants 
O’Meara received the National Endowment for the Arts Media Arts Fellowship from the California Arts Council, Women In Film Foundation's Hollywood Film & Video Grant, and the Stephen Hunter Flick-Creative Cafe Post Production Grant.

See also 
UNICEF Cartoons for Children's Rights
O. Timothy O'Meara

External links
 Eileen O'Meara's Animation Website
 Vimeo
 Great Women Animators Database: Eileen O'Meara
 YouTube
 Sundance Film Festival
 UNICEF
 Panic Attack

References

Living people
American animators
American women animators
American women film directors
American animated film directors
American animated film producers
Artists from Indiana
20th-century American women artists
21st-century American women artists
Film directors from Indiana
American film producers
American women screenwriters
University of Notre Dame alumni
USC School of Cinematic Arts alumni
Year of birth missing (living people)
American women film producers